Elizabeth Dillon may refer to:

 Elizabeth Dillon (writer) (1865–1907), Irish diarist and nationalist
 Elizabeth K. Dillon (born 1960), American federal judge
 Elizabeth O'Shea Dillon (1842–1900), Irish writer